Alex Funke (born October 12, 1944 in Santa Barbara, California) is a special effects photographer.

Career
He worked with Charles and Ray Eames for eleven years, a period he deemed important to his career success. His first Oscar was a shared one for Total Recall. Funke became noted as an expert on miniatures and was brought to New Zealand for work on The Lord of the Rings film trilogy. At the 75th and 76th Academy Awards, he won Best Visual Effects for his work on The Lord of the Rings: The Two Towers and The Lord of the Rings: The Return of the King, respectively. He shared both wins with Jim Rygiel, Joe Letteri and Randall William Cook.

Selected filmography
 1977 – Powers of Ten
 1978 – Battlestar Galactica (1978 TV series)
 1979 – Buck Rogers
 1981 – Heavy Metal
 1988 – The Blob
 1989 – The Abyss
 1990 – Total Recall - Shared an Academy Special Achievement Award for this.
 1991 – Grand Canyon
 1992 – Freejack
 1992 – The Lawnmower Man
 1995 – The Indian in the Cupboard
 1995 – Waterworld
 1996 – Executive Decision
 1996 – The Lawnmower Man 2: Beyond Cyberspace
 1997 – Starship Troopers
 1998 – Snake Eyes
 1998 – Mighty Joe Young
 1999 – Mystery Men
 2001 – The Lord of the Rings: The Fellowship of the Ring
 2002 – The Lord of the Rings: The Two Towers
 2003 – The Lord of the Rings: The Return of the King
 2005 – King Kong
 2008 – The Chronicles of Narnia: Prince Caspian

References

External links
 

Special effects people
People from Santa Barbara, California
1944 births
Living people
Special Achievement Academy Award winners
Best Visual Effects Academy Award winners
Best Visual Effects BAFTA Award winners